Dalia Hertz (born 1942, Tel Aviv) is an Israeli poet.

Hertz received an MA in philosophy from Tel Aviv University. She taught philosophy for several years. She edited and presented literary programs on Israel Radio, published two books of poetry, and wrote three plays. One of these plays, Louise, became an opera with music by Israeli composer Menahem Avidom.

Her very first book of poetry was published in 1961.

References

See The Modern Hebrew Poem Itself (2003)

External links
 Her poem "Margot" transalted into English
 Her poem "Objects" transalted into English
her poem "where have you been?" translated into English
her poem "the prison" is translated into English

Israeli poets
1942 births
Living people
People from Tel Aviv
Tel Aviv University alumni
Recipients of Prime Minister's Prize for Hebrew Literary Works